Giorgi Megrelishvili (born 10 March 1976, in Tbilisi) is a Georgian actor, director and scriptwriter.

Biography
An actor Giorgi Megrelishvili was born in 1976, 10 March in Tbilisi Georgia. He married Nino Rukhadze in 2002. They have one child- Aleksandre Megrelishvili.

Filmography

Films directed
2013: "Fight to the End"
2013: "The Tractor"
2017: "Hamlet" ( the modern version)

Acting career
2013: "Fight to the End"
2013: "The Tractor"
2017: "Hamlet"
2018: "Ekvtime: Man of God"

References

External links
 

1976 births
Male film actors from Georgia (country)
Film directors from Georgia (country)
Living people